Zinc finger protein 24 is a protein that in humans is encoded by the ZNF24 gene.

References

Further reading

External links 
 

Transcription factors